Sir David Frost (1939–2013) was a British broadcaster.

David Frost may also refer to:
David Frost, Baron Frost (born 1965), British politician and former diplomat
David Frost (canoeist) (born 1965), Canadian sprint canoeist
David Frost (golfer) (born 1959), South African golfer
David Frost (producer) (fl. 2000s), music producer
David Frost (sports agent) (born 1967 or 1968), former NHL Players' Association sports agent
Dave Frost (born 1952), retired American baseball player

See also
David Frost House, a historic house in Cambridge, Massachusetts
David Forst (born 1976), American baseball executive